Mikhail Fisenko (born June 1, 1990) is a Russian professional ice hockey centre. He is currently playing for Metallurg Magnitogorsk of the Kontinental Hockey League (KHL).

Playing career
Fisenko played two major junior years in North America, with the Vancouver Giants and Calgary Hitmen of the Western Hockey League. He made his KHL debut playing with Metallurg Novokuznetsk during the 2011–12 KHL season.

Following the completion of the 2016–17 season, Fisenko was traded by Admiral Vladivostok to Avangard Omsk in exchange for Tigran Manukyan and defender Ivan Mishchenko on May 8, 2017.

After two seasons with Avangard Omsk, Fisenko moved as a free agent to fellow KHL club, Ak Bars Kazan, on 16 May 2019.

Fisenko enjoyed two seasons with Ak Bars Kazan, before leaving as a free agent following the 2020–21 season. On 19 May 2021, Fisenko joined HC Dynamo Moscow on a two-year contract.

After just one season with Dynamo, Fisenko prior to the 2022–23 season opted to leave Moscow and sign a one-year contract in joining his eighth KHL club, Metallurg Magnitogorsk on 31 August 2022.

Career statistics

Regular season and playoffs

International

References

External links

1990 births
Living people
Admiral Vladivostok players
Ak Bars Kazan players
Amur Khabarovsk players
Avangard Omsk players
Calgary Hitmen players
HC Dynamo Moscow players
Kuznetskie Medvedi players
Metallurg Magnitogorsk players
Metallurg Novokuznetsk players
HC Sibir Novosibirsk players
People from Magnitogorsk
Russian ice hockey centres
Vancouver Giants players
Yermak Angarsk players
Sportspeople from Chelyabinsk Oblast